Henry Ferdinand Halloran (9 August 1869 – 22 October 1953) was a major property owner and developer in New South Wales in the early part of the twentieth century.

Halloran was born in Sydney, his father was a bank clerk and architect named Edward Roland Halloran and mother was Adeline Burgess, née Reuss. His grandfather was also called Henry Halloran and his great grandfather was Laurence Hynes Halloran, who arrived in Australia as a  convict transported to Sydney.  Halloran attended Sydney Boys High School and Newington College. He qualified as a surveyor in 1890 and became a conveyancer and valuer. After establishing Henry F. Halloran & Co. in 1897, Halloran became a significant figure in property development and urban planning in New South Wales from the 1880s through to the 1950s. His developments included Seaforth and Warriewood in Sydney in 1906, and—the unsuccessful—Environa near Canberra in 1930. There were other Halloran subdivisions at Stanwell Park, near Orient Point, and at Currarong.

He also built structures at Tanilba Bay in 1931. He attempted to create a place called Pacific City near Jervis Bay. The site of Pacific City was to have been west of Hyams Beach and would have extended west to the St Georges Basin shoreline. He also attempted to create a place called Port Stephens City near North Arm Cove, but only a small village ever eventuated.

Halloran began the revival of the ghost town of South Huskisson, on the western shore of Jervis Bay. He renamed the deserted 'Old Township', Vincentia, in 1952. He did not live to see it reborn, as a holiday destination, following land sales for holiday homes (also known as 'weekenders'), which occurred in the 1950s and 1960s.

Halloran died on 22 October 1953 at the age of 84.

Legacy

The University of Sydney, established the Henry Halloran Trust, aimed at promoting scholarship, innovation and research in town planning, urban development and land management. Several collections of Halloran's papers, including maps and survey notes detailing land and property subdivision throughout New South Wales, are held at the State Library of New South Wales.

Also part of his legacy are significant portions of undeveloped marginal land, now owned by his heirs or the Halloran Trust, that from time to time are proposed for development. Another legacy is privately owned land near North Arm Cove, which Halloran sold after subdivision, much of which is zoned non-urban and can never be built upon.

See also 
 Henry Halloran (poet)  (Grandfather)
Laurence Hynes Halloran (Great grandfather)

References

1953 deaths
1869 births
Real estate and property developers
People from Sydney
People educated at Newington College